Tyson Gillies (born October 31, 1988) is a Canadian former professional baseball outfielder. He was the Seattle Mariners' 25th round selection in the 2006 Major League Baseball draft. He graduated from R. E. Mountain Secondary School in Langley, British Columbia and is a member of the Canadian national baseball team.

Professional career

Seattle Mariners
He recorded a single in his first career at-bat, June 23 against the Arizona League Angels. He recorded three stolen bases on August 6 against the Arizona League Royals. He was transferred to the Short-Season Everett AquaSox on August 31, recording five hits in eight at-bats. He participated in the Mariners 2007 Arizona Fall League.

Gillies began the  season with the Class-A Advanced High Desert Mavericks. He appeared in 11 games where he only hit .200. He was then promoted to High A baseball where he hit .233 with one RBI and no home runs.

Philadelphia Phillies
On December 16, 2009, he was traded by the Mariners to the Phillies along with Phillippe Aumont, and J. C. Ramirez as part of a three team trade that included Major League Baseball All-Stars Cliff Lee and Roy Halladay. Gillies said this about the trade:

Gillies was added to the team's 40-man roster on November 18, 2011. He was outrighted off the roster on June 6, 2014.

San Diego Padres
On February 27, 2015, Gillies signed a minor league contract with the San Diego Padres.

Sugar Land Skeeters
On March 18, 2016, Gillies signed with the Sugar Land Skeeters of the Atlantic League of Professional Baseball. He was released on June 27, 2016.

Ottawa Champions
On June 7, 2017, Gillies signed with the Ottawa Champions of the Can-Am League. On February 20, 2018, Gillies was traded from the Ottawa Champions to the Gary SouthShore RailCats of the American Association. He was released prior to the 2018 season on May 18.

York Revolution
On June 15, 2018, Gillies signed with the York Revolution of the Atlantic League of Professional Baseball. He was released on July 3, 2018.

Québec Capitales
On January 26, 2019, Gillies signed with the Québec Capitales of the Can-Am League. He was released on July 21, 2019.

Personal life
At age four, Gillies was diagnosed with a hearing impairment that has left him with 30 percent hearing in one ear and 50 percent in the other. Thanks to the use of hearing aids and an ability to read lips Gilles has little trouble overcoming his impairment. He said this about his disability:

On August 20, 2010, Gillies was arrested and charged in Clearwater, Florida on felony cocaine possession. After attending a bar the night of the arrest, Gillies was offered a ride to his hotel by a police officer. Before entering the police cruiser, the officer searched Gillies for weapons and paraphernalia and did not find Gillies to be possessing anything illegal. Upon dropping Gillies off, the officer found a three-gram bag of a white powdery substance that appeared to be cocaine on the floor of the backseat of the cruiser and arrested Gillies for possession. Within hours of the arrest, Gillies underwent drug testing and showed no traces of cocaine, marijuana or opiates in his system.

The state attorney's office dropped all charges against Gillies because the backseat of the cruiser was not thoroughly searched before Gillies entered the vehicle, the officer failed to find the substance during a routine search of Gillies before he entered the vehicle, and because the substance failed two on-site drug tests.

Gillies said of the charges being dropped, "I’m glad that this ordeal is over, but I’m still very upset that it happened to me and that my character, which I’ve worked so hard to build, can even be questioned."

References

External links

1988 births
Living people
Arizona League Mariners players
Baseball players at the 2015 Pan American Games
Baseball players at the 2019 Pan American Games
Baseball people from British Columbia
Black Canadian baseball players
Cardenales de Lara players
Canadian expatriate baseball players in Venezuela
Canadian expatriate baseball players in the United States
Canadian disabled sportspeople
Clearwater Threshers players
Deaf baseball players
Canadian deaf people
Everett AquaSox players
Florida Complex League Phillies players
High Desert Mavericks players
Lakewood BlueClaws players
Lehigh Valley IronPigs players
Pan American Games gold medalists for Canada
Pan American Games medalists in baseball
Pan American Games silver medalists for Canada
Québec Capitales players
Reading Fightin Phils players
Reading Phillies players
San Antonio Missions players
Scottsdale Scorpions players
Sportspeople from Vancouver
Sugar Land Skeeters players
World Baseball Classic players of Canada
York Revolution players
2013 World Baseball Classic players
Medalists at the 2015 Pan American Games
Medalists at the 2019 Pan American Games